Whalebone or baleen is a filter-feeder system inside the mouths of baleen whales.

Whalebone may also refer to:
 Whalebone (album), by Marc Douglas Berardo
 Whalebone (horse), a racehorse
 Whalebone Tavern, a former pub in London, famous as a meeting place for 17th century radicals
 Whalebone Vineyard, a California wine estate